Casimir Pulaski Day is a local holiday officially observed in Illinois, on the first Monday of March in memory of  Casimir Pulaski (March 6, 1745 – October 11, 1779), a Revolutionary War cavalry officer born in Poland as Kazimierz Pułaski. He is praised for his contributions to the U.S. military in the American Revolution and known as "the father of the American cavalry".

Description
Casimir Pulaski Day is celebrated mainly in areas that have large Polish populations, such as Chicago, Bloomington, and Du Bois. The focus of official commemorations of Casimir Pulaski Day in Chicago is at the Polish Museum of America where various city and state officials congregate to pay tribute to Chicago's Polish Community.

The city of Chicago celebrated its first official Pulaski Day in 1986. On February 26, 1986, Mayor Harold Washington introduced a resolution to designate the first Monday in March General Casimir Pulaski Day, and the City Council approved. The Chicago Public Library closes in observance of Pulaski Day but Chicago Public Schools remain open. Pulaski Day stopped being a holiday for Chicago Public Schools in 2012 as a way to increase the number of days in the school year, although some Illinois schools still observe the holiday depending on snow days.

This is a separate holiday from the federal observance, General Pulaski Memorial Day, which commemorates Pulaski's death from wounds suffered at the Siege of Savannah October 11, 1779.

Illinois enacted a law on September 13, 1977, to celebrate the birthday of Casimir Pulaski and held the first official Pulaski Day celebrations in 1978. The bill was introduced by State Senator Norbert A. Kosinski, a Democrat from Chicago, and signed by Thomas Hynes, President of the Senate, on June 26, 1977. Cook County government offices, the Chicago Public Library, and statewide public and private schools are closed on this holiday.

Wisconsin public schools also observe Casimir Pulaski Day, although they do not close for it.  Banks in Illinois may close for the holiday.

Section 118.02 of the Wisconsin Statutes provides that, "...when school is held or, if the day falls on a Saturday or Sunday, on a school day immediately preceding or following the respective day, the day shall be appropriately observed...." The use of "shall" denotes this as a mandatory requirement.  Each public school in Wisconsin must observe Casimir Pulaski Day on March 4.  How the day is observed — "appropriately" — allows for some discretion among the schools.

Buffalo, New York also acknowledges a "Pulaski Day," which is held in the middle of July, and is celebrated with an annual parade.

On November 6, 2009, President Barack Obama signed a joint resolution of the U.S. Senate and House of Representatives making Pulaski an honorary American citizen, 230 years after his death. He is one of eight people to be granted honorary United States citizenship.

Grand Rapids, Michigan hosts a "Pulaski Days" celebration annually on the first full weekend of October in recognition of General Pulaski and the Polish culture in general.

In popular culture

Sufjan Stevens titled a song "Casimir Pulaski Day" on his album Illinois. The song interweaves his memories of a friend's battle with bone cancer with an account of the holiday as indicated by the lyric: "... in the morning, in the winter shade, on the first of March, on the holiday, I thought I saw you breathing." 

Big Black, a Chicago-based post-hardcore band active between 1982 and 1987, have a song titled "Kasimir S. Pulaski Day".

Chicago-based alternative hip-hop artist Kidd Russell titled a song "Pulaski Day" produced by Cisco Adler. The single was released on Pulaski Day 2012, and was featured on the front page of Vevo. The video has a cameo from professional wrestler Colt Cabana. The song is an uptempo track that features lyrics about Chicago in the summer time  ... "north beach in the summer time, lake shore drive is on my mind, no matter where I go, the city has my soul, Pulaski Day, Pulaski Day, We are going to party like Pulaski Day!"

See also
 Von Steuben Day
 Public holidays in Illinois

References

External links
Casimir Pulaski Day

Polish-American culture in Chicago
Culture of Chicago
Illinois culture
Holidays related to the American Revolution
State holidays in the United States
March observances
Sunday observances
Holidays and observances by scheduling (nth weekday of the month)
Monuments and memorials to Casimir Pulaski
Military personnel from Illinois